Chandra is  a  village and a gram panchayat in the Midnapore Sadar CD block in the Medinipur Sadar subdivision of the Paschim Medinipur district in the state of West Bengal, India.

Geography

Location

Area overview
Paschim Medinipur district (before separation of Jhargram) had a total forest area of 1,700 km2, accounting for 14.31% of the total forested area of the state. It is obvious from the map of the Midnapore Sadar subdivision, placed alongside, is that there are large stretches of forests in the subdivision. The soil is predominantly lateritic. Around 30% of the population of the district resides in this subdivision. 13.95% of the population lives in urban areas and 86.05% lives in the rural areas.

Note: The map alongside presents some of the notable locations in the subdivision. All places marked in the map are linked in the larger full screen map.

Demographics
According to the 2011 Census of India, Chandra had a total population of 675, of which 344 (51%) were males and 331 (49%) were females.

.*For language details see Midnapore Sadar (community development block)#Language and religion

Education
Chandra High School is a Bengali-medium co-educational institution established in 1949. The school has facilities for teaching from class V to class XII. It has a library with 18,401 books, 14 computers and a playground.

Healthcare
Chandra (Deypara) Block Primary Health Centre, with 15 beds at Chandra, is the major government medical facility in the  Midnapore Sadar CD block.

References

Villages in Paschim Medinipur district